Scirpophaga gilviberbis is a moth in the family Crambidae. It was described by Philipp Christoph Zeller in 1863. It is found on the Comoros and in the Democratic Republic of the Congo, Kenya, South Africa, Zambia, India, Indonesia (Java, Sulawesi), Myanmar, Singapore, Thailand and Vietnam.

The wingspan is 20–22 mm for males and 23–35 mm for females. The forewings of the males are ochreous with some fuscous scales. The hindwings are white, except for the costal area and the apex which are ochreous. Females have white forewings and hindwings. The anal tuft is whitish grey to dark grey.

The larvae feed on Oryza species, including Oryza sativa.

References

Moths described in 1863
Schoenobiinae
Moths of Africa
Moths of Asia